This is a list of notable novels set in Crete:

 The Colossus of Maroussi — Henry Miller (1941)
 The Sea Eagle — James Aldridge (1944)
 The Egyptian — Mika Waltari (1945)
 Zorba the Greek — Nikos Kazantzakis (1946)
 Ill Met by Moonlight — W. Stanley Moss (1950)
 A War of Shadows — W. Stanley Moss (1952)
 Captain Michalis — Nikos Kazantzakis (1955)
 The Cretan Runner — George Psychoundakis (1955)
 Dark Labyrinth — Lawrence Durrell (1958)
 The King Must Die — Mary Renault (1958)
 The Moon-Spinners — Mary Stewart (1962)
 Cast In Doubt — Lynne Tillman (1992)
 Der kretisches Gast — Klaus Modick (2003)
 You Are Here — Steve Horsfall (2004)
 The Innocent and the Guilty — Maro Douka (2004)
 The Island — Victoria Hislop (2005)
 The Memory of Tides — Angelo Loukakis (2006)
 Wish You Were Here — Mike Gayle (2007)
 The Tomb of Zeus — Barbara Cleverly (2007)
 Blood of Honour — James Holland (2010)
 The Sword (Volume 1) — Luna Brothers (2010)
 Digging at the Crossroads of Time — Christos Morris (2012)
 "The Theseus Code" - Marc Hammond (1981)
 "Korakas" - Anne Holloway (2015)
 "The Threshing Circle" - Neil Grimmett (2014)
 "Knossos" - Laura Gill (2014)
  “Kritsotopoula: Girl of Krista” - Yvonne Payne (2015)
Lies that bind us-Andrew Hart

 
Crete
Crete in fiction
Cretan literature